Ataxia is the sixth studio album released by alternative / psychedelic-rock band Circus Devils on October 31, 2008.  All songs on Ataxia were written and performed by Robert Pollard, Todd Tobias, and Tim Tobias.

Reaction 

"The music jumps from dark crawlspace paranoia to sexy swaggering rock to postpunk jerky new wave to ethereal planes of exultation, all within matters of seconds. One moment you’re bobbing your head and the next moment you’re terrified, asking yourself, “What’s going on here? This is scaring me.” And though Circus Devils have always followed whatever crooked and strange or delicately beautiful paths they’ve chosen, their records have gotten consistently more and more intricate, refined, bold, and solid, Ataxia being their most dynamic and strange offering as of yet."  
-  Steve Five for Skyscraper Magazine (issue #29)

"The determinedly annoying Circus Devils' sixth album finds Robert Pollard sounding like a peyote-visionary lumberjack who has wandered into a rehearsal by a 1970s progressive-rock band, then edited the giant jams down into exhilarating two-minute slivers. Ataxia is Yes’s Tales From Topographic Oceans remade in miniature from pottery fragments and human toenail clippings."  
-- Stewart Lee for The London Sunday Times.

"The overall tone of Ataxia is almost Gothic in its dark mystique. Songs seem to bubble up amidst a cauldron of haunting, atmospheric sounds. "Get Me Extra!," for example, emerges from an uneasy haze of feedback, while opener "Under Review" has to battle a morose drone in order to attain footing. This makes for an intriguing album that is more than a set of songs, but instead a continuing story; this, in turn, frames the record's better songs nicely." 
- Indieville.com

Track listing

  "Under Review"
  "I Razors"
  "Freedom's Monster"
  "That's the Spirit" (inst.)
  "Backwash Television"
  "The Girls Will Make It Happen"
  "Mayflower Brought Disease"
  "Stars, Stripes and Crack Pipes"
  "Ataxia" (inst.)
  "Nets at Every Angle" 
  "Hi, I'm Martha.  How are you?"
  "Lunatic Style"
  "Get Me Extra!"
  "I Found the Black Mind"
  "He Had All Day"
  "Fuzz in the Street" 
  "Rat Faced Ballerina"

References

External links 
 the Official Circus Devils site
 [ Circus Devils at allmusic.com]

Circus Devils albums
2008 albums